Triphora is a genus of very small sea snails, marine gastropod molluscs in the subfamily Triphorinae of the family Triphoridae.  

The genus was named by Blainville in 1828, and the type species is Triphora gemmata Blainville, 1828. Like most of the other genera in this family, the shells of species in this genus are extremely high-spired with sculptural decoration, and are sinistral (left-handed) in coiling.

Nomenclature
Species that were named in combination with Triphoris, Triforis, or Trifora, which are variant spellings of Triphora, and have not been placed elsewhere in the literature are listed here under Triphora. In such cases, where the original genus is a misspelling or emendation of the current genus, the authors and dates have not been placed in parentheses (ICZN Article 51.3.1). For Triforis of authors, see Trituba and related genera in Newtoniellidae.

Species
There are well over 300 species in this genus.

 Triphora abacoensis Rolán & Redfern, 2008
 Triphora abrupta (Dall, 1881)
 Triphora acicula Issel, 1869
 Triphora acuta (Kiener, 1841) 
 Triphora adamsi Bartsch, 1907
 Triphora aequatorialis Thiele, 1925
 Triphora aethiopica Thiele, 1925
 Triphora affinis  Hinds, 1843
 † Triphora affinis Deshayes, 1865 (invalid, junior primary homonym of T. affinis Hinds, 1843)
 Triphora africana Bartsch, 1915
 Triphora agulhasensis Thiele, 1925
 Triphora albanoi Bakker & Swinnen, 2021
 Triphora alboapicata Thiele, 1930
 Triphora alexandri Tomlin, 1931 
 Triphora alternata C. B. Adams, 1852 
 † Triphora ambigua Deshayes, 1864 
 Triphora amicorum Rolán & Fernández-Garcés, 2008 
 Triphora amoena Hervier, 1898 
 Triphora angustissima  Deshayes, 1863
 † Triphora antwerpiensis Marquet, 1996 
 Triphora aporema Rehder, 1980
 Triphora armandoi Espinosa & Ortea, 2020
 Triphora arrondoi Fernández-Garcés, Rolán & Espinosa, 2020
 † Triphora aspera Deshayes, 1864 
 Triphora atea Bartsch, 1915
 Triphora atlantica E. A. Smith, 1890 
 Triphora atomus Issel, 1869
 Triphora aurea Hervier, 1897
 Triphora axialis Barnard, 1963 (taxon inquirendum)
 † Triphora bacillus Deshayes, 1864 
 Triphora bactron Barnard, 1963
 Triphora bacula Barnard, 1963
 † Triphora bantamensis Oostingh, 1933 
 † Triphora bartschi Olsson, 1916 
 Triphora barnardi Tomlin, 1945
 Triphora bathyraphe E. A. Smith, 1890 
 † Triphora benoisti Cossmann, 1906 
 Triphora bicincta Odhner, 1917
 Triphora bicolor Pease, 1868
 † Triphora bigranosa Koenen, 1891 
 † Triphora bilineata O. Meyer, 1886 
 † Triphora biplicata Rouault, 1848 
 † Triphora borealis (Kautsky, 1925) 
 † Triphora brevicula Cossmann, 1889 
 Triphora brevis Thiele, 1925: synonym of Triphora sabita Bartsch, 1915
 † Triphora bruguieri (Michelotti, 1847) 
 Triphora brunnea Pease, 1871 
 Triphora brunnescens Thiele, 1930
 Triphora burnupi E.A. Smith, 1910 
 † Triphora buscheri Landau, Ceulemans & Van Dingenen, 2018 
 Triphora callipyrgus Bartsch, 1907
 Triphora calva Faber & Moolenbeek, 1991
 Triphora candida  Hinds, 1843
 Triphora capensis Bartsch, 1915
 † Triphora caribbeana Weisbord, 1962 †
 Triphora caracca Dall, 1927 : synonym of Monophorus caracca (Dall, 1927)
 Triphora carpenteri Bartsch, 1907
 Triphora castaneofusca Thiele, 1930
 Triphora catalinensis Bartsch, 1907
 Triphora cerea E. A. Smith, 1906
 Triphora chamberlini F. Baker, 1926
 Triphora charybdis  Fernandes & Pimenta, 2015
 Triphora chathamensis Bartsch, 1907
 † Triphora chauvereauensis Landau, Ceulemans & Van Dingenen, 2018 
 Triphora chrysolitha Kay, 1979
 † Triphora cincta Kaunhowen, 1898 
 † Triphora clarae O. Boettger, 1902 
 Triphora clio Hedley, 1899
 Triphora coelebs  Hinds, 1843
 Triphora coetiviensis Melvill, 1909
 Triphora collaris  Hinds, 1843
 Triphora concatenata Melvill, 1904
 Triphora concinna  Hinds, 1843
 † Triphora conoidalis Rouault, 1848 
 Triphora contrerasi F. Baker, 1926
 Triphora convexa E. A. Smith, 1904
 Triphora cookeana Baker & Spicer, 1935
 Triphora cornuta Hervier, 1898 
 Triphora costata Pease, 1871 
 † Triphora costulata Deshayes, 1864 
 † Triphora crassicrenata Cossmann & Pissarro, 1901 
 Triphora cylindrella Dall, 1881
 Triphora cylindrica Pease, 1871 
 Triphora dagama Barnard, 1963
 Triphora dalli Bartsch, 1907
 Triphora dealbata (C. B. Adams, 1850)
 Triphora delicatula Thiele, 1912
 Triphora dilecta Thiele, 1925
 † Triphora diozodes Cossmann, 1889
 Triphora distincta  Deshayes, 1863
 Triphora dives Thiele, 1925
 Triphora earlei Kay, 1979
 Triphora ellyae De Jong & Coomans, 1988
 Triphora elsa Bartsch, 1915
 Triphora elvirae De Jong & Coomans, 1988
 Triphora escondidensis F. Baker, 1926
 Triphora eucharis Rehder, 1980
 Triphora evermanni F. Baker, 1926
 Triphora excellens E. A. Smith, 1903
 Triphora excolpus Bartsch, 1907
 Triphora exilis Dunker, 1860
 Triphora exomilisca Rehder, 1980
 † Triphora fernandezgarcesi Landau, Ceulemans & Van Dingenen, 2018 
 † Triphora fontasensis Doncieux, 1908 
 Triphora farquhari Tomlin, 1932
 Triphora formosa  Deshayes, 1863
 † Triphora fossilis Willett, 1937 
 Triphora fucata Pease, 1861
 Triphora fulvescens Hervier, 1898 
 Triphora fuscomaculata (Sowerby III, 1904)
 Triphora fuscozonata (Sowerby III, 1907)
 Triphora galapagensis Bartsch, 1907
 Triphora gemmata Blainville, 1828
 † Triphora gortanii Selli, 1974 
 Triphora goubini Hervier, 1898 
 Triphora gracilior E. A. Smith, 1903
 Triphora granulifera Jousseaume, 1884
 Triphora grayii  Hinds, 1843
 Triphora grenadensis Rolán & Lee, 2008
 Triphora guadaloupensis Rolán & Fernández-Garcés, 2008 
 † Triphora guttata Guppy, 1867 
 † Triphora gymna Cossmann, 1919 
 Triphora hannai F. Baker, 1926
 Triphora harrisi Baker & Spicer, 1935
 Triphora hebes (Watson, 1880)
 Triphora helena Bartsch, 1915
 Triphora hemileuca Tomlin, 1931 
 Triphora hemphilli Bartsch, 1907
 † Triphora herouvallensis de Raincourt, 1877 
 † Triphora hildeverti Doncieux, 1908
 Triphora hircus Dall, 1881
 Triphora idonea Melvill & Standen, 1901
 Triphora ignobilis Thiele, 1925
 † Triphora imperatrix O. Boettger, 1902 
 † Triphora inaequipartita Deshayes, 1866 
 Triphora inclara Kosuge, 1974
 Triphora incolumis Melvill, 1918
 Triphora inconspicua C. B. Adams, 1852 
 Triphora interpres Melvill, 1918
 † Triphora inversa (Lamarck, 1804) 
 Triphora isleana Velain, 1878
 Triphora johnstoni F. Baker, 1926
 † Triphora kanakoffi Willett, 1948 
 Triphora keiki Kay, 1979
 Triphora laddi Kay, 1979
 Triphora lamyi Selli, 1973
 Triphora leucathema Rehder, 1980
 † Triphora lherbettorum Landau, Ceulemans & Van Dingenen, 2018 
 Triphora lilaceocincta E. A. Smith, 1903
 Triphora lilacina (Dall, 1889)
 Triphora loisae Rehder, 1980
 † Triphora longissima Doncieux, 1908 
 Triphora loyaltiensis Hervier, 1898 
 Triphora madgei Viader, 1938
 Triphora madria Bartsch, 1915
 † Triphora major O. Meyer, 1886 
 † Triphora malayana P. J. Fischer, 1921
 Triphora marmorata  Hinds, 1843: synonym of Euthymella flammulata (Pease, 1861)
 Triphora marshi Strong & Hertlein, 1939
 Triphora martii Rolán & Fernández-Garcés, 1995
 Triphora medinae Parodiz, 1955
 Triphora melantera Hervier, 1898 
 † Triphora meridionalis O. Meyer, 1886 
 Triphora metcalfeii  Hinds, 1843
 Triphora milda Bartsch, 1915
 † Triphora minuata Deshayes, 1864
 † Triphora miopygmaea Landau, Ceulemans & Van Dingenen, 2018 
 Triphora mirifica  Deshayes, 1863
 † Triphora mitella Dall, 1892 
 Triphora monteiroi Rolán & Fernández-Garcés, 2015
 Triphora montereyensis Bartsch, 1907
 Triphora morgani Barnard, 1963
 Triphora natalensis Barnard, 1963
 Triphora nina Bartsch, 1915
 Triphora nivea Verco, 1909
 Triphora nodifera A. Adams & Reeve, 1850
  † Triphora nodosoplicata Benoist, 1873
 Triphora oreada Bartsch, 1915
 Triphora osclausum Rolán & Fernández-Garcés, 1995
 Triphora oweni F. Baker, 1926
 Triphora palmeri Strong & Hertlein, 1939
 Triphora panamensis Bartsch, 1907
 † Triphora papaveracea Benoist, 1873 
 † Triphora passyi Deshayes, 1864 
 Triphora patricia Thiele, 1925
 Triphora pazensis F. Baker, 1926
 Triphora pedroana (Bartsch, 1907)
 Triphora peninsularis Bartsch, 1907
 † Triphora peyreirensis Cossmann & Peyrot, 1921 
 † Triphora pezanti Cossmann, 1913 
 † Triphora plesiomorpha Cossmann & Pissarro, 1901 
 Triphora plebeja Thiele, 1925
 Triphora portoricensis Rolán & Redfern, 2008
 † Triphora praelonga Koenen, 1891 
 Triphora pseudonovem Rolán & Lee, 2008
 Triphora pulchella A. Adams, 1854
 Triphora punctata Pease, 1871 
 Triphora pupaeformis  (Deshayes, 1863)
 Triphora pura E. A. Smith, 1903
 Triphora pusilla (Pfeiffer, 1840)
 Triphora pustulosa Pease, 1871 
 Triphora pyrrha (Henderson & Bartsch, 1914)
 † Triphora radiospirata Marquet, 1996 
 † Triphora rakhiensis Eames, 1952
 Triphora recta E. A. Smith, 1890 
 Triphora regia Thiele, 1925
 † Triphora regina O. Boettger, 1902 
 † Triphora richei Doncieux, 1908 
 Triphora robusta Pease, 1871 
 Triphora rufotincta(Kosuge, 1963)
 Triphora rushii Dall, 1889
 Triphora sabita Bartsch, 1915
 † Triphora sancticlementensis Landau, Ceulemans & Van Dingenen, 2018 
 Triphora scala Barnard, 1963
 Triphora sceptrum Thiele, 1925
 Triphora schmidti Schepman, 1909
 † Triphora sculptata Cossmann & Pissarro, 1901 
 Triphora scylla  Fernandes & Pimenta, 2015
 Triphora shepstonensis E. A. Smith, 1906
 † Triphora similis O. Meyer, 1886 
 † Triphora singularis Deshayes, 1866 
 † Triphora sinistrorsa (Deshayes, 1833) 
 Triphora slevini F. Baker, 1926
 Triphora smithi Bartsch, 1915
 † Triphora staadti Cossmann, 1907 
 Triphora stearnsi Bartsch, 1907
 Triphora stephensi Baker & Spicer, 1935
 † Triphora subcalcarea Oostingh, 1941
 Triphora subulata Thiele, 1930
 † Triphora sulcata Tenison Woods, 1878 
 Triphora sulcosa Pease, 1871 
 Triphora superba Thiele, 1925
 Triphora suturalis A. Adams & Reeve, 1850
 Triphora taeniolata Hervier, 1898 
 † Triphora taurorara Sacco, 1895 
 † Triphora terebrata Heilprin, 1887 
 Triphora thaanumi Kay, 1979
 † Triphora tricarinata Meunier, 1880 
 † Triphora tricornuta Cossmann & Pissarro, 1901 
 † Triphora tricostata Szőts, 1953 
 Triphora tristis  Hinds, 1843
 Triphora tuberculata Pease, 1871 
 Triphora tubifera Thiele, 1925
 Triphora turtlebayensis Rolán & Lee, 2008
 Triphora vanduzeei F. Baker, 1926
 Triphora vargasi Rehder, 1980
 Triphora vestalis A. Adams, 1854
 Triphora virginalis Thiele, 1925
 † Triphora washingtoniana Dickerson, 1915 
 Triphora yociusi Rolán & Lee, 2008

References

 Deshayes, G.P. 1832. Encyclopédie Méthodique. Histoire naturelle des vers. Paris: Panckoucke Vol. 3 pp. 595–1152.
 Chang, C-K & Wu, W-L 2005. The Taiwan Mollusks II - Triphoridae (Mollusca: Mesogastropoda) from Lutao, Taitung. Taiwan: Research Center for Biodiversity, Academia Sinica pp. 1–116.

External links
 Blainville, H. de 1828. Dictionnaire des Sciences naturelles, dans lequel on traite méthodiquement des différens êtres de la nature, considérés soit en eux-mêmes ... d'après l'état actuel de nos connais sciences, soit relativement a l'utilité qu'en peuvent retirer la mediciné. Vol. 1.
 Bory de Saint-Vincent, J.B.M. & coll. (1830). Dictionnaire classique d'histoire naturelle. Tome seizième, T-Z. [vol. 16. pp. 1-748. Paris. Rey & Gravier & Amable Gobin et Cie]
 Marshall B.A. (1983) A revision of the Recent Triphoridae of southern Australia. Records of the Australian Museum supplement 2: 1-119